Ananthasayanam (Leaning posture with the head rested on one's hand) is a 1942 Tamil language film produced by and starring Krishnaswami Subrahmanyam in the lead role. Subrahmanyam co-directed the film with C. S. V. Iyer. The film also featured S. D. Subbulakshmi and M. V. Rajamma as the female leads with G. Pattu Iyer and V. N. Janaki playing supporting roles.

Plot
Diwakarar (Subrahmanyam) is a devotee of Vishnu in the form of Anantha Padmanabhaswamy. He is forced by to marry his niece Sarasa (Janaki). Diwakarar is not interested in the alliance and wishes to pursue his devotion to God by denouncing married life. He walks out of his wedding ceremony to the shock of all who are present there and goes in search of salvation and enlightenment.

Cast
Adapted from The Hindu and the film's song book

Male Cast
 K. Subramanyam  as Diwakarar
 G. Pattu Iyer as Sheriff
 Vidwan Srinivasan as King
 M. R. S. Mani as Swedha Chandran
 P. R. Rajagopala Iyer as Kuravar
 C. N. Sadasivaiah as Kuravar
 Jolly Kittu Iyer a King's Priest
 R. S. Ramaswami Iyengar as Maha Vishnu
 S. Radhakrishnan as Chera Nation King
Support Cast
Clown Sambhu, Ramachandran, Kulathu Mani,and Thanjavur Mani Iyer.

Female Cast
 S. D. Subbulakshmi as Mohini
 M. V. Rajamma as Susheela
 R. B. Lakshmi Devi as Mohini's mother
 V. N. Janaki as Sarasa
 K. Nagalakshmi as Diwakarar's mother
 T. S. Rajammal as Manjula
 Kumari Subbulakshmi as Young Krishnan

Production
Ananthasayanam marked the acting debut of Krishnaswami Subrahmanyam, who also directed and produced the film under his own banner Madras United Artistes Corporation.
 The dialogues were written by both Subrahmanyam and S. A. Durai while Subrahmanyam himself handled the screenplay. The cinematography was done by Kamal Ghosh. Durai incorporated into the screenplay information and hymns on Anantha Padmanabhaswamy Palmyra leaf manuscripts that were preserved by the territory of Travancore.

C. V. Ramakrishnan worked as an assistant cinematographer to Ghosh. G. Pattu Iyer, while playing a supporting role in the film, was an assistant director to Subrahmanyam along with K. J. Mahadevan. Principal photography for the film was done at Gemini Studios.

Soundtrack
V. S. Parthasarathy Iyengar composed the film's music and score while Papanasam Sivan and Rajagopal Iyer wrote the lyrics for the songs. According to film critic and historian Randor Guy, none of the songs became popular.

Reception
Guy noted that the film was remembered for the "surprising on-screen appearance of the Indian film pioneer K. Subramanyam." Ananthasayanam did not do well at the box office.

References

1942 films
1940s Tamil-language films
Indian drama films
Indian black-and-white films
Hindu devotional films
Films directed by K. Subramanyam
1942 drama films